Thomas Mogford (born 10 April 1977, in Oxford) is a British author known for the Spike Sanguinetti series of crime novels. He came up with the character of Spike after reading Law as a postgraduate at City University, London, and travelling to Gibraltar to look into praticising there.

The first book in the series, Shadow of the Rock, was shortlisted for the ITV3 Crime Thriller Awards for best debut writer. The second, Sign of the Cross, and third Hollow Mountain, were both shortlisted for the CrimeFest eDunnit Award.

All five novels in the series have been optioned for television by Endor Productions.

His forthcoming novel, The Planthunter, marks a move into historical fiction. The book is ‘a sweeping love story and white-knuckle adventure ride, set in 1867 bringing to life a period in history when real-life Indiana Jones characters risked their lives to find the exotic plants that fill our gardens today,’ according to The Bookseller.

Thomas Mogford is married to the screenwriter Ali Rea, and they live with their family in London.

Bibliography 

Shadow of the Rock (2012)
Sign of the Cross (2013)
Hollow Mountain (2014)
Sleeping Dogs (2015)
A Thousand Cuts (2017)

References

External links 
Official Website of Thomas Mogford

1977 births
Living people
Writers from Oxford
British crime fiction writers